In computational complexity theory, a pseudo-polynomial transformation is a function which maps instances of one strongly NP-complete problem into another and is computable in pseudo-polynomial time.

Definitions

Maximal numerical parameter 
Some computational problems are parameterized by numbers whose magnitude exponentially exceed size of the input. Suppose that  is an encoding of a computational problem  over alphabet , then

 

Pseudo-polynomial transformation 

 
  can be computed in time polynomial in two variables  and 
 
 

Proving strong NP-completeness 
The following lemma allows to derive strong NP-completeness from existence of a transformation:

Proof of the lemma 

From the definition of strong NP-completeness there exists a polynomial  such that  is NP-complete.

For  and any  there is

Therefore,

From this and the definition of strong NP-completeness it follows that  is strongly NP-complete.

References 

Strongly NP-complete problems
Complexity classes
Computational complexity theory